Elisabeth Hilmo (born 29 November 1976) is a Norwegian team handball player and World Champion. She was born in Trondheim. She received a bronze medal at the 2000 Summer Olympics in Sydney.

References

External links

1976 births
Living people
Norwegian female handball players
Olympic handball players of Norway
Handball players at the 2000 Summer Olympics
Olympic bronze medalists for Norway
Olympic medalists in handball
Medalists at the 2000 Summer Olympics
Sportspeople from Trondheim
20th-century Norwegian women